Tattguine Arrondissement is an arrondissement of the Fatick Department in the Fatick Region of Senegal. Its chef-lieu is Tattaguine.

Subdivisions
The arrondissement is divided administratively into rural communities and in turn into villages.

Arrondissements of Senegal
Fatick Region